Gary Lee Figueroa (born September 28, 1956, in Phoenix, Arizona) is a former water polo player from the United States, who won the silver medal with Team USA at the 1984 Summer Olympics in Los Angeles, California. In 1992, he was inducted into the USA Water Polo Hall of Fame.

He currently coaches boys water polo at York School in Monterey, California .

See also
 List of Olympic medalists in water polo (men)

References

External links
 

1956 births
Living people
American male water polo players
Olympic silver medalists for the United States in water polo
Water polo players at the 1984 Summer Olympics
University of California, Irvine alumni
Sportspeople from Phoenix, Arizona
Place of birth missing (living people)
California State University, Monterey Bay
Medalists at the 1984 Summer Olympics
American water polo coaches